BBNGLive 1 and BBNGLive 2 (stylized in all caps) are a pair of albums released by BadBadNotGood in 2011 and 2012, respectively. The albums were released at regular intervals between the band's debut and second studio albums. Both albums were self-released as free downloads and helped build buzz for the band during their inaugural year. The band's next live record would be their Spotify Live EP, released by Innovative Leisure in 2017.

Recording and release 
BBNGLive 1 was recorded at one of the band's first shows, a 2011 club date in Toronto. Most of the tracks performed also appear on one of the band's earlier releases. Exceptions include the "DOOM" medley, which was released as a standalone single later in 2011, and the Joy Division cover "Division."

BBNGLive 2 differs from 1 as it recorded while the band was producing music for their album BBNG2 and acts as a teaser for that record. BBNGLive 2 was recorded at Club Koko in London where the band had been invited to play by Gilles Peterson at the Worldwide Awards.

During this period, the band also released the studio recordings "DOOM" and BBNGSingle, which was the original track "Rotten Decay" backed with the band's "Hard is Da Paint" cover.

Reception 
Regarding BBNGLIVE1, its release was covered by publications including Hypebeast and The Needle Drop, with the latter's Anthony Fantano commenting, "it's nice to hear these guys in a live setting."

Thomas Carroll from All About Jazz reviewed BBNGLIVE 2, giving the record 4.5 stars. In his review, he called the music "intense and... [demonstrating] a mature sensibility in regards to dynamics and a large degree of harmonic and rhythmic freedom" and commented that the band was "well on its way to building a strong positive international reputation."

Track listing 
Credits adapted from Bandcamp.

Personnel 
Adapted from Bandcamp.

BADBADNOTGOOD

 Matthew A. Tavares – keys
 Chester Hansen – electric bass, synth bass
 Alex Sowinski – drums, sampler

Technical and art

 Matt MacNeil – engineering, mixing (BBNGLive 1)
 Matthew A. Tavares – mixing (BBNGLive 1)
 Club Koko – engineering, mixing (BBNGLive 2)
 Sam Zaret – cover photography (BBNGLive 1)
 Jade Cooling – cover photography (BBNGLive 2)
 Connor Olthuis – album art  (BBNGLive 1)

References 

BadBadNotGood albums
2011 live albums
2012 live albums